Veena Misra is an engineer from North Carolina State University in Raleigh. She was named a Fellow of the Institute of Electrical and Electronics Engineers (IEEE) in 2012 for her contributions to metal electrodes and high-K dielectrics for CMOS applications.

References 

Fellow Members of the IEEE
Living people
21st-century American engineers
Year of birth missing (living people)
North Carolina State University faculty
Place of birth missing (living people)
American electrical engineers